Rammea is an extinct genus in the Tettigoniidae, containing a single specie, Rammea laciceps. The type locality is Böttingen in Germany. It is the only genus and specie in the subfamily Rammeinae.

References

Tettigoniidae